Matthew Abelson is an American hammered dulcimer player. Originally from Princeton, New Jersey, he lives in Cleveland Heights, Ohio.

Abelson performs in a variety of styles from classic Celtic tunes to Folk-Rock. His audiences have included President Bill Clinton, Vice President Al Gore, author Anne Rice and others, and he has played over 1,000 shows throughout the continental United States and Canada. Abelson has presented workshops on aspects of being a performing musician and on the history of the dulcimer at the Starwood Festival, Sirius Rising, Wellspring Gathering, and other events in the festival circuit. He has released three full-length CDs on his own label, Flying Dulcimer Recordings. Abelson is now performing, recording, and teaching full-time. He appears extensively at colleges, universities, major festivals and coffee houses throughout the Mid-Atlantic region, Michigan and his home state of Ohio. In May 1999, Abelson took first place at the Mid-East Regional Hammered Dulcimer Competition.

Discography
The Flying Dulcimer (Flying Dulcimer Productions)
 1997 - From Here To There (Flying Dulcimer Productions)
 2001 - Perspective (with Sam Bush, Vassar Clements, and others) (Flying Dulcimer Productions)

Notes

References
.
.
.

External links 
Official web site

Hammered dulcimer players
People from Princeton, New Jersey
Musicians from New Jersey
Living people
Year of birth missing (living people)